Carlos Hasbún (born 27 September 1949) is a Salvadoran athlete. He competed in the men's hammer throw at the 1968 Summer Olympics.

References

1949 births
Living people
Athletes (track and field) at the 1968 Summer Olympics
Salvadoran male hammer throwers
Olympic athletes of El Salvador
Sportspeople from San Salvador